Kilmore Gap is a broad and low saddle located between Wallan and Kilmore in Victoria, Australia.

Geography
It forms a break in the Great Dividing Range, separating the Western Highlands from the more mountainous Eastern Highlands. Located on the Kilmore Gap is Pretty Sally or Pretty Sally Hill.

Transport
It serves as a  gateway to the interior plains from Melbourne and surrounding settlements, and as such has developed as a  major transport corridor, including the  Hume Highway and a rail line, both of which are principal links between Melbourne and Sydney. It is also used by VFR flights on the Melbourne Inland Route from Sugarloaf Reservoir to Kilmore.

Climate
The Bureau of Meteorology has operated a weather station known as Wallan (Kilmore Gap) since 1993. Because the area is located on the windward side of the Great Dividing Range, it receives snowfall in the winter due to its exposure to westerly frontal systems.

References

Mountain passes of Australia
Great Dividing Range